is a railway station in the city of Akita, Akita Prefecture, Japan, operated by East Japan Railway Company (JR East).

Lines
Ōbarino Station is served by the Ōu Main Line, and is located 280.0 km from the starting point of the line at Fukushima Station.

Station layout
The station has one side platform serving one bi-directional track, connected to the station building by a footbridge. The tracks of the Akita Shinkansen run in-between the station building and the platform.

History
Ōbarino Station opened as the Funaoka Signal Stop on November 10, 1921, It was renamed the Ōbarino Signal Stop on February 25, 1929. It was closed from February 1933 to October 10, 1940. On February 1, 1950 it became a passenger railway station. It has been unattended since December 1, 1979. The station was absorbed into the JR East network upon the privatization of JNR on April 1, 1987. A new station building was completed in April 2006.

Surrounding area
 Jinnai River
Kishibojin Shrine

See also
List of railway stations in Japan

References

External links

 JR East station information 

Railway stations in Akita Prefecture
Ōu Main Line
Railway stations in Japan opened in 1950
Buildings and structures in Akita (city)